Gattyana amondseni is a scale worm described from the Arctic and North Atlantic Oceans at depths down to about 700 m.

Description
Gattyana amondseni is a short-bodied worm with 38 segments and 15 pairs of elytra, which bear a marginal fringe of papillae. The lateral antennae are positioned ventrally on the prostomium, directly beneath the median antenna. Notochaetae are about as thick and sometimes thinner than the  neurochaetae.

References

Phyllodocida